Metropolis is a compilation album by the English electronic group Client. It was first released digitally on 2 May 2005, and was later made available on CD on 20 April 2006 exclusively at the Client Store. The album contains remixes, B-sides and rarities.

Track listing
"Tuesday Night" – 3:33
"Dirty Little Secret" – 3:16
"Radio" (Boosta Rockanarchy Version) – 5:10
"Radio" (Cicada Instrumental) – 7:23
"Radio" (Rex the Dog Instrumental) – 5:51
"Pornography" (The Zip Mix) – 7:42
"Pornography" (The Zip Alien Sex Mix) – 7:43
"Pornography" (Motor Mix) – 5:55
"Radio" (Radio Session) – 3:55
"It's Rock and Roll" (Radio Session) – 4:07
"In it for the Money" (Radio Session) – 3:49
"In it for the Money" (Zip Mix Uncensored) – 5:03

References

2005 compilation albums
Client (band) compilation albums
Self-released albums